Futatsuno Dam is an arch dam located in Nara prefecture in Japan. The dam is used for power production. The catchment area of the dam is 801 km2. The dam impounds about 230  ha of land when full and can store 43000 thousand cubic meters of water. The construction of the dam was started in 1959 and completed in 1962.

References

Dams in Nara Prefecture